Adventure Island is a 1947 American South Seas action/adventure film shot in Cinecolor and directed by Sam Newfield (using the pseudonym Peter Stewart) for Paramount Pictures' Pine-Thomas Productions. This marked one of the few times in which Newfield worked for a major studio. The film stars Rory Calhoun and Rhonda Fleming.

This film is a remake of the silent film Ebb Tide (1922) and the film Ebb Tide (1937), all based on the 1894 novel of the same name by Robert Louis Stevenson and his stepson Lloyd Osbourne.

Plot

Three sailors and a woman roam an island ruled by a deadly tyrant.

Cast
 Rory Calhoun as Mr. Herrick
 Rhonda Fleming as Faith Wishart
 Paul Kelly as Capt. Donald Lochlin
 John Abbott as Huish
 Alan Napier as Attwater

Production
The film was produced by Pine-Thomas Productions, which specialized in low-budget action films. However, the budget for this film was larger than that of most Pine-Thomas productions.

Rory Calhoun and Rhoda Fleming were borrowed from David O. Selznick. Filming began in September 1946 on Santa Catalina Island. Ninety percent of the film was shot on the island in order to reduce the need for studio space, and the script was rewritten to minimize indoor scenes.

The owner of the boat used in the film later sued the producers for damaging it.

Reception 
In a contemporary review for The New York Times, critic A. H. Weiler compared the film negatively with the 1937 film Ebb Tide: "'Adventure Island' is a dull, incredible and slowly paced fiction of a very venerable school. Paramount's earlier version had the services of Oscar Homolka, Barry Fitzgerald and Ray Milland as well as Technicolor and a professional script. 'Adventure Island' has Cinecolor, which is pleasant, and a script not nearly so pleasant."

See also 
List of films in the public domain in the United States
Ebb Tide (1922)
Ebb Tide (1937)

References

External links 

Adventure Island at TCMDB
Adventure Island at BFI
Review of film at Variety
 (print is in black & white)

1947 films
1940s action adventure films
1940s action comedy films
1940s English-language films
Films based on British novels
Films directed by Sam Newfield
Paramount Pictures films
Films set in Oceania
Cinecolor films
Films based on works by Robert Louis Stevenson
American action adventure films
American action comedy films
1940s American films